The 2007 Valencian regional election was held on Sunday, 27 May 2007, to elect the 7th Corts of the Valencian Community. All 99 seats in the Corts were up for election. The election was held simultaneously with regional elections in twelve other autonomous communities and local elections all throughout Spain.

As in the three previous elections, the People's Party (PP) with an increased absolute majority of seats, as well as winning an absolute majority of votes, the first and only time to date the party has reached this threshold, and only the second time since 1983 that any party has achieved this feat. The PP increased its vote share by more than 5% and gained six of the additional ten seats in the parliament, enlarged as a result of 2006 amendments to the regional Statute of Autonomy, all but ensuring incumbent president Francisco Camps's re-election for a second term in office. The Socialist Party of the Valencian Country (PSPV–PSOE) gained three seats despite seeing its vote share decrease by one point. This came as a result of the enlarged parliament, but the new election defeat and the below-expectations result for the party led to PSPV leader Joan Ignasi Pla to announce that he would step down as party secretary-general in the next congress.

The Valencian Nationalist Bloc (Bloc), whose performance in the previous election brought it within 0.3% of reaching the five percent threshold, had formed an electoral alliance with United Left of the Valencian Country (EUPV) under the name Commitment for the Valencian Country (CPV). This combined list, which also included smaller Green and left-wing groups, saw the Bloc gain its first seat representation in the Corts, though the combined vote for both EUPV and Bloc was considerably lesser than what both had polled separately in 2003.

Overview

Electoral system
The Corts Valencianes were the devolved, unicameral legislature of the Valencian autonomous community, having legislative power in regional matters as defined by the Spanish Constitution and the Valencian Statute of Autonomy, as well as the ability to vote confidence in or withdraw it from a regional president.

Voting for the Corts was on the basis of universal suffrage, which comprised all nationals over 18 years of age, registered in the Valencian Community and in full enjoyment of their political rights. The 99 members of the Corts Valencianes were elected using the D'Hondt method and a closed list proportional representation, with a threshold of five percent of valid votes—which included blank ballots—being applied regionally. Parties not reaching the threshold were not taken into consideration for seat distribution. Seats were allocated to constituencies, corresponding to the provinces of Alicante, Castellón and Valencia, with each being allocated an initial minimum of 20 seats and the remaining 39 being distributed in proportion to their populations (provided that the seat-to-population ratio in any given province did not exceed three times that of any other).

Election date
The term of the Corts Valencianes expired four years after the date of their previous election, with elections to the Corts being fixed for the fourth Sunday of May every four years. The previous election was held on 25 May 2003, setting the election date for the Corts on Sunday, 27 May 2007.

The Corts Valencianes could not be dissolved before the date of expiry of parliament. In the event of an investiture process failing to elect a regional president within a two-month period from the first ballot, the Corts were to be automatically dissolved and a snap election called.

Parties and candidates
The electoral law allowed for parties and federations registered in the interior ministry, coalitions and groupings of electors to present lists of candidates. Parties and federations intending to form a coalition ahead of an election were required to inform the relevant Electoral Commission within ten days of the election call, whereas groupings of electors needed to secure the signature of at least one percent of the electorate in the constituencies for which they sought election, disallowing electors from signing for more than one list of candidates.

Below is a list of the main parties and electoral alliances which contested the election:

Opinion polls
The table below lists voting intention estimates in reverse chronological order, showing the most recent first and using the dates when the survey fieldwork was done, as opposed to the date of publication. Where the fieldwork dates are unknown, the date of publication is given instead. The highest percentage figure in each polling survey is displayed with its background shaded in the leading party's colour. If a tie ensues, this is applied to the figures with the highest percentages. The "Lead" column on the right shows the percentage-point difference between the parties with the highest percentages in a poll. When available, seat projections determined by the polling organisations are displayed below (or in place of) the percentages in a smaller font; 50 seats were required for an absolute majority in the Corts Valencianes (45 until 11 April 2006).

Results

Overall

Distribution by constituency

Aftermath

Notes

References
Opinion poll sources

Other

2007 in the Valencian Community
Valencian Community
Regional elections in the Valencian Community
May 2007 events in Europe